Pinochia monteverdensis  is a plant species native to Costa Rica, Guatemala and Oaxaca.

Pinochia monteverdensis  is a liana climbing over other vegetation. Leaves are elliptic or oblanceolate, up to 13 cm long and 4 cm wide, tapering to a point at the tip. Calyx lobes are tapering, up to 2 mm long, with hairs. Corolla white, up to 4 mm long, the tube hairless but the lobes hairy. Follicle non-hairy, up to 20 cm long.

References

Odontadenieae
Flora of Costa Rica
Flora of Oaxaca
Flora of Guatemala